Biloxi station is a closed and unstaffed Amtrak intercity train station in Biloxi, Mississippi.  There is no station building; there is only a covered platform. The station is across the street from the Biloxi Transit Center, which serves Coast Transit Authority and Greyhound buses.

Amtrak service to Biloxi began with the Gulf Coast Limited, which operated between 1984 and 1985. The stop was reactivated on March 31, 1993 in service on the Sunset Limited. Damage to the rail line resulting from Hurricane Katrina in 2005 caused Amtrak to suspend service east of New Orleans, including at Biloxi.

Prior station 

Into the late 1960s, at another Biloxi station, the Louisville & Nashville operated the daily trains, Gulf Wind (New Orleans - Jacksonville), Pan-American (New Orleans - Cincinnati) and Humming Bird (New Orleans - Cincinnati), as well as an additional unnamed day train (New Orleans - Jacksonville). Additionally, the Southern Railway operated the Crescent and Piedmont Limited (both: New Orleans - New York) through that station.

Notable places
Jefferson Davis Presidential Library
Mississippi Coast Coliseum

References

External links

Amtrak Stations Database

Former Amtrak stations in Mississippi
Buildings and structures in Biloxi, Mississippi
Railway stations in the United States opened in 1984
Railway stations closed in 1985
Railway stations in the United States opened in 1993
Railway stations closed in 2005